is the reconstructed Proto-Germanic name of the Elder Futhark e rune , meaning "horse" (cognate to Latin , Gaulish , Tocharian B , Sanskrit , Avestan  and Old Irish ).

The Proto-Germanic vowel system was asymmetric and unstable. The Younger Futhark continues neither, lacking a letter expressing e altogether. The Anglo-Saxon futhorc faithfully preserved all Elder futhorc staves, but assigned new sound values to the redundant ones, futhorc  expressing a diphthong.

In the case of the Gothic alphabet, where the names of the runes were re-applied to letters derived from the Greek alphabet, the letter  e was named  "horse" as well (note that in Gothic orthography,  represents monophthongic /e/).

Anglo-Saxon rune poem
The Anglo-Saxon rune poem has:
 
   
   
   

"The horse is a joy to princes in the presence of warriors.
   A steed in the pride of its hoofs,
   when rich men on horseback bandy words about it;
   and it is ever a source of comfort to the restless."

Runes